That Strange Person is a hand-painted, 35mm, cel-animated film directed by Eileen O'Meara. It is described as "an animated exploration of the stranger in the mirror".

Cast and crew
 Jane Boegel – voice-over
 Eileen O'Meara – director/animator
 Stephen Hunter Flick, Charles Maynes – sound design

Release, festivals and awards
The film was released at Florida Film Festival in June 1998. It won the Gold Prize at WorldFest-Houston International Film Festival in Experimental Animation, First Prize at Savannah Film Festival, Jury Awards for Animated Short at Florida and Louisville Film Festivals, and Silver Prize at Philadelphia International Film Festival. It was selected for the 1998 Sundance Film Festival, Dresden International Film Festival, Los Angeles Film Festival, and for the 1999 Atlanta Film Festival. It was distributed by David Russell's Big Film Shorts, and released on Warner Home Video Short 5-Diversity and Dancing with the Sun: a Compilation of Selected Short Films from the Sundance Film Festival.

See also 
Panic Attack!
Agnes Escapes from the Nursing Home
 Jamais vu

References

External links 

 Information on the film at eileenomeara.blogspot.com

American avant-garde and experimental films
American independent films
1990s animated short films
American animated short films
1990s avant-garde and experimental films
1990s English-language films
1990s American films